Sergei Yaroshenko (born 6 April 1977) is a Ukrainian former professional tennis player.

Yaroshenko, a left-handed player from Nova Kakhovka, reached a best singles world ranking of 356 and was a member of the Ukraine Davis Cup team between 1996 and 2005. He registered four Davis Cup singles wins, including a five set win over the Ivory Coast's Valentin Sanon in the fifth and deciding rubber of a 2003 tie. His performances on tour included an ITF Futures title in 2001 and a quarter-final appearance at the Prague Challenger in 2004.

ITF Futures finals

Singles: 3 (1–2)

Doubles: 3 (1–2)

References

External links
 
 
 

1977 births
Living people
Ukrainian male tennis players
People from Nova Kakhovka
Sportspeople from Kherson Oblast